Alfred Michael Heist (October 5, 1927 – October 2, 2006) was an American professional baseball player, coach and scout. After a long career in the Pacific Coast League of the 1950s, the outfielder made his Major League debut at the age of 32 and appeared in 177 big-league games for the Chicago Cubs (1960–61) and the Houston Colt .45s (1962).

Heist was born in Brooklyn, New York, and signed with the St. Louis Browns in 1949. Acquired by the top-level Sacramento Solons in 1955, he played almost six full seasons in California's capital before being traded to the Cubs on July 15, 1960. Two days later, he made his first Major League appearance, starting in center field against the St. Louis Cardinals and batting sixth in the lineup against right-hander Larry Jackson. In the seventh inning, he collected his first big-league hit, a single, one of four Chicago hits in a 6–0 shutout loss. On April 15, 1961, Heist hit a walk-off grand slam home run in the ninth inning at Wrigley Field against the Milwaukee Braves. That season, Heist batted .255 with seven home runs and 37 runs batted in.

After the campaign, he was Houston's fifth pick and the ninth overall selection in the 1961 Major League Baseball expansion draft. In the very first inning of the very first Colt .45 game, he stepped in a hole and broke his ankle. Heidt would play just 23 games for the 1962 Colt .45s during their maiden season as Carl Warwick won the starting center field job. Heist then returned to Triple-A for three more seasons before becoming a coach on manager Grady Hatton's Houston Astros staff in 1966–67.

As a Major Leaguer, Heist registered 126 hits, including 20 doubles, six triples and eight home runs.  He died in Tahlequah, Oklahoma, at the age of 78.

References

External links

1927 births
2006 deaths
Chicago Cubs players
Chicago Cubs scouts
Houston Astros coaches
Houston Astros scouts
Houston Colt .45s players
Lewiston Broncs players
Major League Baseball center fielders
Major League Baseball third base coaches
Oklahoma City 89ers players
Redding Browns players
Sacramento Solons players
San Diego Padres coaches
San Diego Padres scouts
San Francisco Giants scouts
Sportspeople from Brooklyn
Baseball players from New York City
Stockton Ports players